Lirimiris truncata is a species of moth in the family Notodontidae (the prominents). It was first described by Gottlieb August Wilhelm Herrich-Schäffer in 1856 and it is found in North America.

The MONA or Hodges number for Lirimiris truncata is 8027.

References

Further reading

 
 
 

Notodontidae
Articles created by Qbugbot
Moths described in 1856